The 1941 San Francisco Dons football team was an American football team that represented the University of San Francisco as an independent during the 1941 college football season. In their first and only season under head coach Jeff Cravath, the Dons compiled a 6–4 record and were outscored by their opponents by a combined total of 206 to 193.

Schedule

References

San Francisco
San Francisco Dons football seasons
San Francisco Dons football